Anthidium wuestneii is a species of bee in the family Megachilidae, the leaf-cutter, carder, or mason bees.

References

wuestneii
Insects described in 1887
Taxa named by Alexander Mocsáry